Macrocoma henoni is a species of leaf beetle from North Africa and Iraq. It was first described by Maurice Pic in 1894, as a species of Pseudocolaspis.

Subspecies
There are three subspecies of M. henoni:
 Macrocoma henoni babylonica Lopatin, 1986: Found in Iraq.
 Macrocoma henoni henoni (Pic, 1894): The nominotypical subspecies. Distributed mainly in Algeria and northern Morocco.
 Macrocoma henoni occidentalis (Escalera, 1914): Distributed mainly in southern Morocco.

References

henoni
Beetles of North Africa
Beetles of Asia
Beetles described in 1894
Insects of the Middle East
Taxa named by Maurice Pic